Synergia-areena is an arena in Jyväskylä, Finland. It is primarily used for ice hockey, and is the home arena of JYP and JYP-Akatemia.

The arena originally opened in 1982 and was then known as Jyväskylän jäähalli. It was renovated and renamed in 2008. The capacity of the arena is 4,628 people.

References

External links 

Indoor arenas in Finland
Indoor ice hockey venues in Finland
Sport in Jyväskylä
Buildings and structures in Central Finland